Castiglione may refer to:

Places

Italy
Many of which were simply called Castiglione prior to the unification of Italy in the 19th century:
Abruzzo
 Castiglione a Casauria, in the province of Pescara
 Castiglione della Valle (now Colledara), in the province of Teramo
 Castiglione Messer Marino, in the province of Chieti
 Castiglione Messer Raimondo, in the province of Teramo
Calabria
 Castiglione Cosentino, in the province of Cosenza
 Castiglione Marittimo, in the province of Catanzaro
Campania
 Castiglione del Genovesi, in the province of Salerno
Emilia-Romagna
 Castiglione dei Pepoli, in the province of Bologna
Lazio
 Castiglione in Teverina, in the province of Viterbo
Lombardia
 Castiglione d'Adda, in the province of Lodi
 Castiglione delle Stiviere, in the province of Mantova - also the site of the Battle of Castiglione
 Castiglione d'Intelvi, in the province of Como
 Castiglione Olona, in the province of Varese
Liguria
 Castiglione Chiavarese, in the province of Genoa
Piedmont
 Castiglione Falletto, in the province of Cuneo
 Castiglione Tinella, in the province of Cuneo
 Castiglione Torinese, in the province of Torino
Sicily
 Castiglione di Sicilia, in the province of Catania
Tuscany
 Castiglion Fibocchi, in the province of Arezzo
 Castiglion Fiorentino, in the province of Arezzo
 Castiglione della Pescaia, in the province of Grosseto
 Castiglione di Garfagnana, in the province of Lucca
 Castiglione d'Orcia, in the province of Siena
Umbria
 Castiglione del Lago, in the province of Perugia

Corsica
 Castiglione, Haute-Corse, a commune of the Haute-Corse département in France, on the island of Corsica

Algeria
 Bou Ismaïl, known under French colonial rule as Castiglione

People
Castiglione (surname)
Virginia Oldoini, Countess of Castiglione

See also 
 Castiglioni
 Castigliano
 Castione (disambiguation)